Portia Arthur (born 7 January 1990) is a Ghanaian author, writer and reporter. She launched her first book titled Against the Odds in July 2018. She also started the Book Per Child Initiative, which aims at inspiring young people to read by supporting them with educational materials and establishing reading clubs in various schools and churches.

Education 
Arthur graduated from the Kwame Nkrumah University, where she studied publishing.

She has the following qualifications to her credit.

Career 
After studying publishing at university, Arthur's first job was with media house Pulse Ghana, under of the supervision of Godfred Akoto Boafo. Inspired by one story she reported on, about the lack of school infrastructure in my neighborhood, she started a project called "The Book Per Child Initiative". As she has said, she saw it as "a way of improving the literacy level of our future leaders. But I reckoned what better way than to contribute to solving the problem I had spotted by actually tapping into my publishing training and passion to write a book? I subsequently also realized I could sponsor some kids with their tuition with proceeds from book sales." As part of the project, her first book, Against the Odds, was launched in 2018.

In 2020, she was appointed General Manager of Blackbusters Family Media.

Awards and recognitions 
Arthur was nominated as the Fashion/Lifestyle Blogger of the Year at the 2019 Ghana Lifestyle Awards. She was also nominated for the MakeUp Blog of the Year at the 2019 Ghana MakeUp Awards for her contribution to Pulse Lifestyle on Pulse Ghana. On 31 January 2020, Arthur was verified on Instagram and Facebook.

References 

1990 births
Ghanaian publishers (people)
Ghanaian women journalists
Ghanaian women writers
Kwame Nkrumah University of Science and Technology alumni
Living people